Masbah Ahmmed (born 11 March 1995) is a Bangladeshi sprinter. He competed in the 100 metres event at the 2013 World Championships in Athletics.

References

External links
 

1995 births
Living people
Bangladeshi male sprinters
People from Bagerhat District
Athletes (track and field) at the 2014 Commonwealth Games
Athletes (track and field) at the 2018 Commonwealth Games
Commonwealth Games competitors for Bangladesh
World Athletics Championships athletes for Bangladesh
Athletes (track and field) at the 2016 Summer Olympics
Olympic athletes of Bangladesh